The long-tailed silky-flycatcher (Ptiliogonys caudatus) is a passerine bird which occurs only in the mountains of Costa Rica and western Panama, usually from 1,850 m altitude to the timberline. It is a thrush-sized species weighing about 37 g. The silky-flycatchers are related to waxwings, and like that group have soft silky plumage.

The habitat of this bird is mountain forests, where the breeding pair builds a neat cup of lichen 2 to 18 m above ground in a tree, sometimes in loose colonies.  The female lays two brown-and-lilac-blotched grey eggs, which are incubated by both adults. The young fledge 18 to 25 days after hatching, and are fed by both parents.

The male long-tailed silky-flycatcher is 24 cm long and has a pale grey forehead. The rest of the crested head, neck, throat and lower belly are yellow. The back, lower breast and upper belly are blue-grey, and the flight feathers and long pointed tail are black. The outer tail feathers are spotted with white.

The female is 21 cm long and generally duller than the male, with a darker grey forehead, olive body plumage and a shorter, duller black tail. Immatures are similar to the adults, but the central tail feathers are shorter and the white spotting on the outer tail is indistinct.

This species forages in small flocks when not breeding, flycatching for insects or taking small fruits, especially mistletoe. Long-tailed silky-flycatchers often perch prominently on high exposed twigs.

The call of the long-tailed silky-flycatcher is a repeated chee-chip.

This species is a host to the biting louse Brueelia ptilogonis.

Gallery

References 

 Stiles and Skutch, A Guide to the Birds of Costa Rica

External links 
 Image
 Biting lice page

long-tailed silky-flycatcher
Birds of the Talamancan montane forests
long-tailed silky-flycatcher